Henry Green was the pen name of Henry Vincent Yorke (1905–1973), an English novelist.

Henry Green or Greene may also refer to:

Arts and entertainment
Henry Towneley Green (1836–1899), English watercolour painter and illustrator
Henry Mather Greene (1870–1954), American architect and designer, founded Greene and Greene with his brother
Graham Greene (Henry Graham Greene, 1904–1991), English novelist

Politics and law

U.K.
Sir Henry Green (English judge) (died 1369), English lawyer and Chief Justice of the King's Bench
Sir Henry Green (courtier) (c. 1347–1399), courtier and councillor of Richard II, executed by Henry IV
Henry Green (fl. 1447), Member of Parliament (MP) for Northamptonshire
Henry Green (MP for Hereford) (fl. 1563), MP for Hereford
Henry Green (British Resident) (1818–1884), British Resident Minister of the Orange River Sovereignty
Henry Green (MP for Poplar) (1838–1900), English shipowner and Liberal Party politician
Henry David Greene (fl. 1892–1906), British Member of Parliament for Shrewsbury

U.S.
Henry Green (Pennsylvania judge) (1828–1900), Chief Justice of the Supreme Court of Pennsylvania
Henry Dickinson Green (1857–1929), U.S. Representative from Pennsylvania
Henry W. Green (born 1949), American judge on the Kansas Court of Appeals

Others
Henry Francis Green (1844–1917), American merchant, banker, manufacturer and politician
Henry Alexander Greene (1856–1921), United States Army officer
Henry A. Greene (1861–1950), American collector of ancient Greek coins
Henry Green (British Army officer) (1872–1935)
H. M. Green (Henry Mackenzie Green, 1881–1962), Australian journalist, librarian and literary historian
Harry Green (athlete) (Henry Harold Green, 1886–1934), English champion marathon runner
Henry Alan Green, professor of religious studies at the University of Miami
Henry Green (poker player), American gambler and poker player from Alabama, inducted into the Poker Hall of Fame in 1986

See also
Harry Green (disambiguation)